Mary Elizabeth Hope, Baroness Glendevon  (1 September 1915 – 27 December 1998) (née Wellcome, later Maugham, formerly Paravicini), was the only child of the English writer W. Somerset Maugham by his then-mistress Syrie Wellcome, a daughter of orphanage founder Thomas John Barnardo.

She was known as Liza, after her father's first successful novel, Liza of Lambeth. She was the plaintiff in one of the most celebrated family law trials of the early 1960s, when she challenged Somerset Maugham's attempt to prove that she was not his child. At her birth in 1915 her mother was still married to the British pharmaceuticals magnate Henry Wellcome, whom she divorced before remarrying to Somerset Maugham in 1917.

In his 1962 memoir Looking Back, Somerset Maugham, a bisexual, denied paternity of Liza. Around the same time, he attempted to have her disinherited in order to adopt his male secretary, suggesting that she was actually the child of Syrie by either Henry Wellcome, Gordon Selfridge or an unknown lover. The subsequent 21-month court case, fought in British and French courts, determined that Maugham was her biological father, and the author was legally barred from his adoption plans. Maugham's daughter was awarded approximately $1,400,000 in damages, comprising $280,000 in a cash settlement to compensate her for paintings originally willed to her, along with royalties to some of his books, and the controlling interest in his French villa.

Marriages and children
She married twice:

First marriage
On 20 July 1936 at St. Margaret's, Westminster, she married Lt. Col. Vincent Rudolph Paravicini, a son of Charles Paravicini, the Swiss Ambassador to the Court of St. James's, by whom she had 2 chldren:
Nicholas Vincent Somerset Paravicini (born 1937), eldest son, who married Mary Ann Parker Bowles, a sister of Andrew Parker Bowles, first husband of Camilla, Duchess of Cornwall, now Queen Consort. They were divorced and, about 1986, he married Susan Rose ("Suki") Phipps (born 1941), by whom he had no children, the daughter of Alan Phipps (who died in the Battle of Leros) by his wife, Veronica Fraser, a daughter of Simon Fraser, 14th Lord Lovat. Suki was brought up by Sir Fitzroy Maclean, 1st Baronet, one of the inspirations for James Bond. Nicholas Vincent Somerset Paravicini had, by his first wife, Mary Ann Parker Bowles, two sons and a daughter:  
Charles Vincent Somerset Paravicini (b. 1968);  
Elizabeth Ann Paravicini (b. 1970);  
Derek Paravicini (b. 1979), the blind autistic savant and musical prodigy.  
Camilla Paravicini (born 1941), who in 1963 became the third wife of Manuel Basil "Bluey" Mavroleon of the Greek shipping family, whom she divorced, and then remarried to Count Frédéric Chandon de Briailles, the Moët et Chandon champagne heir. By her first husband she had two daughters:
Syrie Elizabeth Mavroleon (b.1965), wife of  Mark R.A. Swire, eldest son of Humphrey Roger Swire by his 1st wife Philippa Sophia Kidston-Montgomerie (from 2004 Marchioness Townshend, of Raynham); 
Sacha Mavroleon (b.1969).

Second marriage
In 1948, following her divorce, she married John Hope, 1st Baron Glendevon, with whom she had 2 more children: 
Julian John Somerset Hope, 2nd Baron Glendevon (1950–2009), opera producer, who died without issue; 
Jonathan Charles Hope, 3rd Baron Glendevon (b. 1952), who also has no children.

See also
 Legitimacy (family law)
 Non-paternity event

References

1915 births
1998 deaths
Glendevon
Elizabeth
Maugham family